Barpa Langass (also known as Langass Barp or Langash Barp), is a Neolithic chambered cairn on the Isle of North Uist in the Outer Hebrides of Scotland.  It measures about 72 feet in diameter by 18 feet in height, and is around 5,000 years old.  The roof is constructed of two massive slabs with a third slab superimposed.

The entrance is at the east side.  Although the structure has partially collapsed, it is still possible to enter one chamber.  The antiquary Erskine Beveridge believed that a second and perhaps a third chamber exist.  In or prior to 1911, Dr Beveridge excavated within and near the cairn, and he found evidence of burnt burials as well as pieces of pottery (some with patterned lines), wood ashes, burnt bones, a flint arrowhead, a scraper, and a piece of pierced talc.

Barpa Langass is located at grid reference NF838657(57.570581, -7.291557).  It can be reached via footpath from the A867 about 5 miles southwest of Lochmaddy.  Alternatively, one can park at the Langass Lodge Hotel, follow the footpath to the Pobull Fhinn stone circle, and then continue up Ben Langass to Barpa Langass.

See also
 Cladh Hallan - a Bronze Age site on South Uist

References

Sources

External links

4th-millennium BC architecture in Scotland
Megalithic monuments in Scotland
Archaeological sites in the Outer Hebrides
Scheduled monuments in Scotland
North Uist
Chambered cairns in Scotland